Marco Villa (born 18 July 1978) is a German former professional footballer who played as a striker.

Career
Villa was born in Düsseldorf. He spent five seasons in the Bundesliga with Borussia Mönchengladbach and 1. FC Nürnberg. He is the youngest player for Borussia Mönchengladbach history to score a league goal (on 6 September 1996 in a game against Hamburger SV when he was 18 years and 50 days old).

Personal life
Villa was the best friend of Robert Enke, the former German International.

References

External links
 
 

1978 births
Living people
Association football forwards
German footballers
Germany under-21 international footballers
Germany youth international footballers
German expatriate footballers
Bundesliga players
Austrian Football Bundesliga players
Super League Greece players
KFC Uerdingen 05 players
Borussia Mönchengladbach players
Borussia Mönchengladbach II players
SV Ried players
Panathinaikos F.C. players
1. FC Nürnberg players
S.S. Arezzo players
S.P.A.L. players
Montevarchi Calcio Aquila 1902 players
L'Aquila Calcio 1927 players
Expatriate footballers in Austria
Expatriate footballers in Greece
Expatriate footballers in Italy
German expatriate sportspeople in Austria
German expatriate sportspeople in Greece
German expatriate sportspeople in Italy
Footballers from Düsseldorf